Edwin M. Shook (22 November 1911 – 9 March 2000) was an American archaeologist and Mayanist scholar, best known for his extensive field work and publications on pre-Columbian Maya civilization sites.

Shook was born in Newton, North Carolina. At age 22 he took a job as a draftsman at the Carnegie Institution of Washington which was to lead him into Mesoamerican studies from 1934 to 1998.  In 1955, he became the field director of the University of Pennsylvania's Tikal Project, overseeing and publishing extensive work at Tikal, the largest Classic Maya site.  Other Maya sites Shook worked at include Uaxactun, Copán, Mayapan, Kaminaljuyu, Piedras Negras, Palenque, Seibal, Chichen Itza, and Dos Pilas, in addition to pre-Columbian sites in Costa Rica.

In 1998 Shook donated his archives to the Universidad del Valle de Guatemala. He died at his home in Antigua Guatemala two years later.

References
 Obituary EDWIN M. SHOOK by Michael Love
 Edwin M. Shook Archival Collection, Guatemala City, Guatemala, by Bárbara Arroyo Pieters
 Obituary at obitcentral

External links
 Video: 1960 interview with Ed Shook at Tikal by WWL-TV

American Mesoamericanists
20th-century Mesoamericanists
Mesoamerican archaeologists
Mayanists
University of Pennsylvania faculty
1911 births
2000 deaths
People from Newton, North Carolina
20th-century American archaeologists